Capital participation (sometimes also called equity participation or equity interest) is a form of equity sharing not restricted to housing, in which a company, infrastructure, property or business is shared between different parties. Shareholders invest in a business for profit maximization and  cost savings, e.g., through tax deduction. A visible and controversial form of capital participation can be found in public-private partnerships in which the private sector invests in public projects and usually receive a time-limited concession for ownership or operation to make profits from the acquired property.

See also
 loan
 risk capital
 angel investor
 shareholder
 joint venture
 profit sharing
 private equity
 takeover
 mergers and acquisitions
 privatization

References

Ownership
Investment